Ras-related protein Rab-36 is a protein that in humans is encoded by the RAB36 gene.

References

Further reading